Forkhead box protein N1 is a protein that in humans is encoded by the FOXN1 gene.

Function 

Mutations in the winged-helix transcription factor gene at the nude locus in mice and rats produce the pleiotropic phenotype of hairlessness and athymia, resulting in a severely compromised immune system. This gene is orthologous to the mouse and rat genes and encodes a similar DNA-binding transcription factor that is thought to regulate keratin gene expression. A mutation in this gene has been correlated with T-cell immunodeficiency, the skin disorder congenital alopecia, and nail dystrophy. Alternative splicing in the 5' UTR of this gene has been observed. In the chick embryo, the FOXN1 gene is expressed in the developing thymus, claws and feathers. The expression of FOXN1 in feathers and claws indicates that it may regulate the feather outgrowth. In feather and claws, FOXN1 can potentially regulate expression of keratins similar to mammalian orthologs.  In thymic epithelial cells, FOXN1 has been shown to bind to and regulate genes involved in T-cell maturation and antigen presentation.

References

Further reading 

 
 
 
 
 
 
 
 
 
 

Forkhead transcription factors